Nha Hố is a village of Ninh Sơn District, Ninh Thuận Province, Vietnam.

References

Populated places in Ninh Thuận province